Sacred Songs of Mary is a 2010 compilation album from Valley Entertainment featuring music devoted to Mary (mother of Jesus).

Track listing

References

2010 compilation albums
New-age compilation albums
Valley Entertainment compilation albums